Holywell Cemetery is next to St Cross Church in Oxford, England. The cemetery is behind the church in St Cross Road, south of Holywell Manor on Manor Road and north of Longwall Street, in the parish of Holywell.

History
In the mid 19th century, the graveyards of the six parishes in central Oxford became full, so Merton College made some of its land available to form the cemetery in 1847.
The cemetery was established along with Osney Cemetery and St Sepulchre's Cemetery. In 1855, new burials were forbidden at all Oxford city churches, apart from in existing vaults.

The cemetery is now a wildlife refuge with many birds (including pheasants that nest there) and butterflies, as well as small and larger mammals, including Muntjac deer and foxes. Hedgehogs are also known to live there.

Notable interments and memorials

A number of well-known people are buried in the cemetery, including:
 Henry Wentworth Acland, physician and educator, and Sarah Acland, after whom the Acland Home is named
 James Blish, the American expatriate author
 Sir Reader Bullard and his sons Sir Giles Bullard and Sir Julian Bullard, all diplomats
 Maurice Bowra, Warden of Wadham College, Oxford and Vice-Chancellor of Oxford University
 John William Burgon, Dean of Chichester Cathedral
 Theophilus Carter, said to be the model for the Mad Hatter in Lewis Carroll's Alice's Adventures in Wonderland
 George Claridge Druce, botanist and Mayor of Oxford
 Hugo Dyson, member of the Inklings
 Francis Edgeworth, statistician and economist
 Austin Farrer, Warden of Keble College, Oxford
 Kenneth Grahame, author of The Wind in the Willows
 Abel Hendy Jones Greenidge, classical historian formerly of Balliol, Hertford and Brasenose
 Francis Llewellyn Griffith, Egyptologist and founder of the Griffith Institute
 Nora Griffith, Egyptologist and founder of the Griffith Institute
 Charles Buller Heberden, Principal of Brasenose College, Oxford and Vice-Chancellor of Oxford University
 Andrew John Herbertson, geographer
 William West Jones, Archbishop of Cape Town
 Sir Richard Lodge, historian
 Agnes Catherine Maitland, educationnist, principal at Somerville College
 Max Müller, philologist and Orientalist, Fellow at All Souls College, Oxford
 Walter Pater, essayist and critic
 Bartholomew Price, Master of Pembroke College, Oxford
 Lord Redcliffe-Maud, civil servant and Master of University College, Oxford, and his wife Jean Redcliffe-Maud
 John Rhys, Principal of Jesus College, Oxford
 George Rolleston, physician and zoologist
 John Stainer, composer and organist
 Kenneth Tynan, theatre critic and author
 Thomas Herbert Warren, President of Magdalen College, Oxford
 Charles Williams, novelist, poet and member of the Inklings
 William Wallace, Scottish philosopher
 F. H. Bradley, British idealist philosopher
 A. C. Bradley, British literary scholar
 Henry George Woods, President of Trinity College, Oxford
 Margaret Louisa Woods, poet and novelist

A wooden grave marker that was used to mark the grave of the England Rugby captain Ronald Poulton-Palmer at Ploegsteert wood is affixed to a wall in the cemetery.

The cemetery contains three war graves that are maintained and registered by the Commonwealth War Graves Commission – two British Army officers of World War I and a Royal Air Force officer of World War II.

Friends
A Friends of Holywell Cemetery has been established to raise funds and manage the cemetery.

See also
 Osney Cemetery
 St Sepulchre's Cemetery
 Wolvercote Cemetery

References

Sources

External links
 This is Oxfordshire information
 Friends of Holywell Cemetery
 Holywell Cemetery: An Oxford Secret by Janet Keene
 
 Holywell Cemetery, Oxford: Famous people

1847 establishments in England
Christianity in Oxford
Anglican cemeteries in the United Kingdom
Cemeteries in Oxford
Holywell Cemetery